Ibniyamin Abusugutovich Akhtyamov (sometimes — Abusugudovich, ; 6 November 1877, Ufa — 1941, USSR) was a lawyer and a deputy of the Fourth Imperial Duma from the Ufa Governorate between 1912 and 1917. He was a chairperson of the All-Russian Congress of Representatives of Muslim Public Organizations, held in Petrograd. In December 1916, he was a lawyer at the trial of the participants in the Central Asian insurrection. After the start of the Russian Civil War, he took part in the Committee of Members of the Constituent Assembly. In Soviet era, he was arrested in 1938 and died in 1941. His brother was a menshevik, Ibrahim Akhtyamov (1880—1931).

Literature 
 Усманова Д. М. Ахтямов Ибниямин Абусугутович (in Russian) // Государственная дума Российской империи: 1906—1917 / Б. Ю. Иванов, А. А. Комзолова, И. С. Ряховская. — Москва: РОССПЭН, 2008. — P. 29. — 735 p. — .
 Ахтямов (in Russian) // Члены Государственной думы (портреты и биографии): Четвертый созыв, 1912—1917 г. / сост. М. М. Боиович. — Москва: Тип. Т-ва И. Д. Сытина, 1913. — P. 355. — LXIV, 454, [2] p. 
 Таиров Н. Дальнейшая судьба Ибниамина Ахтямова  // Гасырлар авазы — Эхо веков. — 2000. — № 3/4. — ISSN 2073-7483. (in Russian)

1877 births
1941 deaths
Politicians from Ufa
People from Ufimsky Uyezd
Socialist Revolutionary Party politicians
Members of the 4th State Duma of the Russian Empire
Russian lawyers